Ilva Bagnolese was an Italian football club from the Bagnoli area of Naples. The club is most noted for competing in the early Italian Football Championship competitions during the 1920s, after that period they began to decline spending the 1940s in Serie C.

The last season of Ilva Bagnolese was played out in Serie D where they were relegated to Prima Categoria. Instead of going through with the relegation they merged with Ischia Isolaverde in 1960.

References

Defunct football clubs in Italy
Football clubs in Naples
Association football clubs established in 1909
Association football clubs disestablished in 1960
Italian football First Division clubs
1909 establishments in Italy
1960 disestablishments in Italy